"Zaalima" (Urdu ) is an Indian Urdu song from the Bollywood film Raees. The song is written by Amitabh Bhattacharya, composed by JAM8 and sung by Arijit Singh and Harshdeep Kaur. The music video of the song is picturised upon actors Shah Rukh Khan and Mahira Khan. The song was choreographed by Bosco-Caesar.

Background

Actor Shah Rukh Khan shared multiple teasers of the song "Zaalima" on Twitter along with some lyrics before the full release of the song.

The female singer of the song Harshdeep Kaur informed to the Indian media in an interview, that the female pitch of the song had to be sounded different than the male pitch in the song.

She continued, "When I first heard "Zaalima," I knew this song would be a hit." It has a great recall value and is a very catchy song. We have never before heard the word "Zaalima" in a love song.

Release
Upon its release within three days the song garnered over 20 million views.

As of October 2021, the song has more than 283 million views on YouTube official video, which makes it one of the most-streamed Bollywood songs on the platform.

Critical reception
Bollywood Hungama's Joginder Tuteja in the review of the song Zaalima wrote, 
"Amitabh Bhattacharya's lyrics carry a mature flavour to them and the moment Arijit Singh starts rendering these words, 'Zaalima' goes to a different level altogether. Moreover, Harshdeep Kaur's voice is an added asset to this wonderful song that has in it to find running on a repeat mode after it has been heard once".

Times of India in its review of the song wrote "JAM8's 'Zaalima', showcases Shah Rukh Khan at his romantic best. The melody is striking, and Arijit Singh and Harshdeep Kaur stand out in the number, which gives the word zaalima (oppressor) a poetic twist".

Personnel
The song credits mentioned in the official music video's description of the song Zaalima on YouTube are,

  JAM8 – music
 Amitabh Bhattacharya – lyrics
 Arijit Singh and Harshdeep Kaur – vocals
  Dj Phukan, Sunny M.R – sound designers
 Sourav Roy, Dj Phukan, Sunny M.R. Rohan Chauhan, Arijit Singh – programmers
 Shadab Rayeen – Mixing and Mastering Engineer
 Abhishek Sortey – Assistant
 Ashwin Kulkarni – Shoot mix
 Ashwin Kulkarni, Himanshu Shirlekar, Aaroh Velankar, Kaushik Das – recording engineers
Akashdeep Sengupta, Kaushik Da, Tushar Joshi – vocal conductor.
Firoz Shaikh   – harmonium
Alan Hertz     – drums
 Ernest Tibbs – bass
 Iqbal Azad – duff
 Pawan Rasaily and Arijit Singh – acoustic guitars
 Pawan Rasaily – electric guitars.

Accolades

References

2017 songs
Songs written for films
Hindi film songs
Songs with lyrics by Amitabh Bhattacharya
Arijit Singh songs